Lanford may refer to:

 Lanford Monroe (1950–2000), American realist painter and sculptor
 Lanford Wilson (born 1937), American playwright
  Oscar Eramus Lanford III, (1940-2013), American mathematician.

See also

 Roseanne (TV series), set in the fictional town of Lanford, Illinois